This page provides the summaries of the matches of the qualifying tournaments divided into three groups, two of five teams and one of six teams. The winners of each group qualified for the 1976 Summer Olympics tournament held in Montreal. Three teams qualified – Iran, North Korea and Israel.

Qualifying tournaments

Group 1
The qualifying tournament of group 1 was held in Tehran.

Round 1

Iran won the group and qualified for the 1976 Summer Olympics football tournament.

Group 2
The qualifying tournament of group 2 was held in Jakarta.

Round 1

Final

North Korea won the group and qualified for the 1976 Summer Olympics football tournament.

Group 3

Round 1

Japan advanced to the second round.

South Korea advanced to the second round.

Israel advanced to the second round.

Round 2

Israel won the group and qualified for the 1976 Summer Olympics football tournament.

References

External links
http://www.rsssf.com/tableso/ol1976q.html#Games of the XXI. Olympiad - rsssf.com

Asia
1976